Simbai Rural LLG is a local-level government (LLG) of Madang Province, Papua New Guinea. The Kalam language is spoken in the LLG.

Wards
04. Ainong
05. Momuk
06. Kaironk
07. Fongoi
08. Fundum
09. Gubun
10. Nugunt
11. Koki
12. Yambunglem
13. Kerevin
14. Kurumdek
15. Kandum
16. Tinam
17. Aigram
18. Kampaying
19. Babaimp
20. Kumbruf
21. Tsungup

References

Local-level governments of Madang Province